Prommanusorn Phetchaburi School (abbreviated "PB") is located in Thailand. It is located on 278 Bandaiit Road, Moung, Phetchaburi. It consists of two level of education, lower secondary education and higher secondary education, in a coeducational system.

History 
 In 1886, Phra Ajahn Rit established the school at Plubplachai Temple.
 In 1894, Phra Ajahn Suwanmunee taught reading and writing Thai language in his temple until children can read and write well.
 In 1901, the school of Khongkharam Temple is a reputation and popularity until it can set up a primary school named Bumrung Thai.
 In 1909, the school of Plubplachai Temple transferred school and students from Plubplachai Temple to combine with the school of Bumrung Thai.
 In 1951, the Ministry of Education renamed this school as Phetchaburi School.
 In 1954, when Mr. Kowit Torwong was school principal, he moved the school into the grant hill Mahaisawan. It had the deserted temple but it has more space than the original and is not far from the community.
 In 1956, this school is renamed as Prommanusorn Phetchaburi School to commemorate Col. Mangkorn Promyokhee. It is the private boys school.
 In 2000, coeducational school opened in lower secondary education and higher secondary education.

References 

Schools in Thailand